The 1943 Duke Blue Devils football team was an American football team that represented Duke University as a member of the Southern Conference during the 1943 college football season. In its second season under head coach Eddie Cameron, the team compiled an 8–1 record (4–0 against conference opponents), won the conference championship, was ranked No. 7 in the final AP Poll, and outscored opponents by a total of 335 to 34.

The team ranked first among the nation's 76 major college teams in both scoring offense (37.2 points per game) and scoring defense (3.8 points per game).

The team played its home games at Duke Stadium in Durham, North Carolina.

Schedule

References

Duke
Duke Blue Devils football seasons
Southern Conference football champion seasons
Duke Blue Devils football